Psychonavigation 4 is a studio album by the electronic artists Bill Laswell and Pete Namlook. It was released in 1999 through FAX +49-69/450464.

Track listing

Personnel 
Adapted from the Psychonavigation 4 liner notes.
Bill Laswell – bass guitar, electronics
Pete Namlook – electronics, producer, cover art

Release history

References

External links 
 Psychonavigation 4 at Bandcamp
 

1999 albums
Collaborative albums
Bill Laswell albums
Pete Namlook albums
FAX +49-69/450464 albums
Albums produced by Pete Namlook